Alexander McKay Edwards (7 April 1876 – 3 June 1938) was a Canadian businessman and politician. Edwards was a  Conservative member of the House of Commons of Canada. He was born in Bothwell, Ontario and became a manufacturer and pharmacist.

The son of Charles Edwards and Annie McKay, Edwards attended the Ontario College of Pharmacy. Besides his work as a pharmacist, he also was president of Galt Stove and Furnace. In 1905, he married Laura Clare.

He was an alderman for Galt for eight years, and mayor of the municipality in 1916 and 1917.

Edwards was first elected to Parliament at the Waterloo South riding in the 1925 general election then re-elected in 1926, 1930 and 1935. Edwards died at his residence in Galt on 3 June 1938 from a heart attack before he had completed his term in the 18th Canadian Parliament. He was survived by his wife, a son and a daughter.

Electoral record

References

External links
 

1876 births
1938 deaths
Members of the House of Commons of Canada from Ontario
Conservative Party of Canada (1867–1942) MPs
Mayors of places in Ontario
People from Cambridge, Ontario
People from Chatham-Kent